Enskede gård is a commune in Söderort, Stockholm, Sweden. It is the site of the Enskede gård metro station.

The headquarters of the Serbian Orthodox Eparchy of Britain and Scandinavia are located in Enskede gård.

References

Districts of Stockholm